Chloroprene is the common name for 2-chlorobuta-1,3-diene (IUPAC name) with the chemical formula CH2=CCl−CH=CH2. Chloroprene is a colorless volatile liquid, almost exclusively used as a monomer for the production of the polymer polychloroprene, better known as neoprene, a type of synthetic rubber.

History
Although it may have been discovered earlier, chloroprene was largely developed by DuPont during the early 1930s, specifically with the formation of neoprene in mind. The chemists Elmer K. Bolton, Wallace Carothers, Arnold Collins and Ira Williams are generally accredited with its development and commercialisation although the work was based upon that of Julius Arthur Nieuwland, with whom they collaborated.

Production
Chloroprene is produced in three steps from 1,3-butadiene: (i) chlorination, (ii) isomerization of part of the product stream, and (iii) dehydrochlorination of 3,4-dichlorobut-1-ene.

Chlorine adds to 1,3-butadiene to afford a mixture of 3,4-dichlorobut-1-ene and 1,4-dichlorobut-2-ene. The 1,4-dichloro isomer is subsequently isomerized to 3,4 isomer, which in turn is treated with base to induce dehydrochlorination to 2-chlorobuta-1,3-diene. This dehydrohalogenation entails loss of a hydrogen atom in the 3 position and the chlorine atom in the 4 position thereby forming a double bond between carbons 3 and 4. In 1983, approximately 2,000,000 kg was produced in this manner. The chief impurity in chloroprene prepared in this way is
1-chlorobuta-1,3-diene, which is usually separated by distillation.

Acetylene process
Until the 1960s, chloroprene production was dominated by the "acetylene process," which was modeled after the original synthesis of vinylacetylene. In this process, acetylene is dimerized to give vinyl acetylene, which is then combined with hydrogen chloride to afford 4-chloro-1,2-butadiene (an allene derivative), which in the presence of copper(I) chloride, rearranges to the targeted 2-chlorobuta-1,3-diene:

This process is energy-intensive and has high investment costs. Furthermore, the intermediate vinyl acetylene is unstable. This "acetylene process" has been replaced by a process, which adds Cl2 to one of the double bonds in 1,3-butadiene, and subsequent elimination of HCl:

Occupational health and safety, and regulations
It is in hazard class 3 (flammable liquid). Its UN number is 1991 and is in packing group 1.

Hazards 
Chloroprene is toxic. It is reactive toward air, giving peroxides, which are also toxic. Handling of and exposure to chloroprene poses an occupational health risk to workers involved in the manufacture and production of neoprene.

As a way to visually communicate hazards associated with chloroprene exposure, the United Nations Globally Harmonized System of Classification and Labeling of Chemicals has designated the following hazards for exposure to chloroprene: flammable, toxic, dangerous to the environment, health hazard and irritant.  Chloroprene poses fire hazard (flash point ). OSHA identifies chloroprene as a category 2 flammable liquid and emphasizes that at least one portable fire extinguisher should be within 10 and no more than 25 feet away from the flammable liquid storage area. OSHA provides resources on addressing flammable liquids at industrial plants which is where the likely exposure to chloroprene exists (see external resources). As a vapor, chloroprene is heavier than air.

According to the National Fire Protection Association's rating system, chloroprene is designated with a category 2 health hazard (temporary incapacitation or residual injury), a category 3 fire hazard (ignition under the presence of moderate heat), and a category 1 reactivity (unstable at high temperatures and pressures).

Chronic exposure to chloroprene may have the following symptoms: liver function abnormalities, disorders of the cardiovascular system, and depression of the immune system.

The Environmental Protection Agency designated chloroprene as likely to be carcinogenic to humans based on evidence from studies that showed a statistically significant association between occupational chloroprene exposure and the risk of lung cancer. As early as 1975, NIOSH had identified the potential health hazards of chloroprene in their bulletin primarily citing two Russian cohort studies from those working with chloroprene in an occupational setting.

Hazard controls 
Several epidemiological studies and toxicological reports provide evidence of chloroprene's capability to inflict occupational health and safety concerns. However, varying reviews of the degree to which chloroprene should be held responsible for health concerns highlight the criticality of sound scientific research.   Only one fatality as a result of chloroprene intoxication has been recorded which was a result of cleaning a container used for chloroprene.
The primary occupational concern for chloroprene is limited to the facilities producing chloroprene and using chloroprene to produce the synthetic rubber, polychloroprene. NIOSH developed a list of actions to address specific workplace hazards. These actions are represented in their diagram of the "Hierarchy of Controls" shown below with the most effective steps at the top and the least effective at the bottom.

The high vaporization potential and flammability of chloroprene has significant implications for handling and storage operations in the occupational setting. In addition, chloroprene has a high reactivity and should be stored away from oxidizing agents such as perchlorate, peroxides, permanganates, chlorates, nitrates, chlorine, bromine, and fluorine. All activities inducing a potential fire hazard should be avoided. For instance, smoking, having open flames or using sparking tools to open or close storage containers should be prohibited. It is also advised that grounded and bonded metal containers are used for the transport of chloroprene.

Occupational exposure limits
A table of occupational exposure limits (OELs) from various jurisdictions follows.  In general, the OELs range from 0.55 ppm to 25 ppm.

In the ACGIH's 2018 TLV and BEI booklet, chloroprene was designated with a skin and an A2 notation. The skin notation designation is based on animal and human research that have shown chloroprene's ability to be absorbed by the skin. An A2 designation by the ACGIH means that the substance is a suspected human carcinogen with support from human data that are accepted as adequate in quality but may not be enough to declare an A1 (known human carcinogen) designation. Additionally, the TLV basis for these designations are due to scientific studies that show an association between chloroprene exposure and lung cancer, upper respiratory tract (URT) and eye irritation.

Environment
The fate of chloroprene in the environment has been examined. Due to its volatility and extreme reactivity, it is not expected to bioaccumulate.

Transportation
Only stabilized chloroprene can be transported in U.S..

References

External links
 
 
 IARC Monograph "Chloroprene."

 
LaPlace, St. John the Baptist Parish, Louisiana 
Safety and Health Topics | Fire Safety | Occupational Safety and Health Administration 
 

Conjugated dienes
Monomers
Organochlorides
Hazardous air pollutants
IARC Group 2B carcinogens
Occupational safety and health